Boiga beddomei, commonly known as Beddome's cat snake, is a species of rear-fanged snake in the family Colubridae. The species is endemic to the Western Ghats of India, in Maharashtra, Gujarat and Goa states.

Geographic range
B. beddomei is found in India, in northern parts of the Western Ghats in Maharashtra state (Bhimashankar, Mulshi, Koyna, Vasota). It is also found in Gujarat, Goa and northern karnataka in the hill ranges.

Etymology
Boiga beddomei is named after Richard Henry Beddome (1830–1911), British army officer and botanist.

Description
Boiga beddomei is a slender snake. The head is distinct from the neck. The vertebral scales are strongly enlarged. The dorsum is grayish brown with dark brown vertebral cross bars. The ventral surface is yellowish-cream, densely powdered with blackish spots.

Scalation
The dorsal scales are arranged in 19 oblique rows at midbody; the vertebral row is strongly enlarged and hexagonal. The ventrals number 238-252 and the subcaudals number 113–127.

Habitat
It is nocturnal and arboreal in habits.

Diet
B. beddomei feeds mainly on dragon lizard, geckos, skinks and frogs.

Reproduction
B. beddomei is oviparous.

References

Further reading
Whitaker, Romulus; Captain, Ashok (2008). Snakes of India, The Field Guide. Chennai, India: Draco Books. 500 pp. .
Wall, Frank (1909). "Remarks on some forms of Dipsadomorphus". Rec. Ind. Mus. 3: 151–155. (Dipsadomorphus beddomei, new species, p. 152).
Ganesh SR, Achyuthan NS, Chandramouli SR, Vogel G (2020). "Taxonomic revision of the Boiga ceylonensis group (Serpentes: Colubridae): re-examination of type specimens, redefinition of nominate taxa and an updated key". Zootaxa 4779 (3): 301–332.

External links
https://web.archive.org/web/20030908172306/http://itgmv1.fzk.de/www/itg/uetz/herp/photos/Boiga_beddomei.jpg
https://www.biotaxa.org/Zootaxa/article/view/zootaxa.4779.3.1

beddomei
Snakes of Asia
Reptiles of India
Reptiles described in 1909
Taxa named by Frank Wall